Jury's Evidence is a 1936 British crime film directed by Ralph Ince and starring Hartley Power, Margaret Lockwood and Nora Swinburne. It was made at Beaconsfield Studios.

It was an early role for Margaret Lockwood.

Cast
 Hartley Power as Edgar Trent  
 Margaret Lockwood as Betty Stanton  
 Nora Swinburne as Mary Trent  
 Sebastian Shaw as Philip  
 Jane Millican as Agatha  
 Patrick Ludlow as Cyril  
 Charles Paton as Crowther  
 Eve Gray as Ruby  
 Tracy Holmes as John Stanton  
 W.E. Holloway  as Judge  
 Dick Francis  as Hodson  
 Philip Strange as Geoffrey  
 Aubrey Fitzgerald as Murphy 
 Kathleen Harrison

References

Bibliography
 Low, Rachael. Filmmaking in 1930s Britain. George Allen & Unwin, 1985.
 Wood, Linda. British Films, 1927-1939. British Film Institute, 1986.

External links
Jury's Evidence at IMDb
Jury's Evidence at TCMDB
Review of film at Variety

1936 films
1936 crime drama films
British crime drama films
Films shot at Beaconsfield Studios
Films directed by Ralph Ince
British black-and-white films
1930s British films
1930s English-language films